Etifelmine (INN; also known as gilutensin) is a stimulant drug. It was used for the treatment of hypotension (low blood pressure).

Synthesis

The base catalyzed reaction between benzophenone [119-61-9] (1) and butyronitrile [109-74-0] (2) gives 2-[hydroxy(diphenyl)methyl]butanenitrile [22101-20-8] (3). Catalytic hydrogenation reduces the nitrile group to a primary amine giving 1,1-diphenyl-2-ethyl-3-aminopropanol [22101-87-7] (4). The tertiary hydroxyl group is dehydrated by treatment with anhydrous hydrogen chloride gas, completing the synthesis of Etifelmine (5).

See also
2-MDP 
Pridefine

References

Stimulants
Amines
Benzhydryl compounds